Khalanga War Memorial is a heritage monument in Dehradun, India, dedicated to the memory of Gorkha soldiers who fought the British in 1814 in the Battle of Nalapani, the first battle of the Anglo-Nepalese War. It has been described as the only monument in the history of warfare to have been erected by a victorious army for its adversaries, as the British were reportedly impressed with the valour of the Gorkhas. The structure falls under the aegis of the Archaeological Survey of India. Every year, a fair is held at the site to commemorate the soldiers and to celebrate Gorkha culture and history.

References

War monuments and memorials
Tourist attractions in Dehradun
Monuments and memorials in Uttarakhand
Indian military memorials and cemeteries
Buildings and structures in Dehradun
1814 sculptures
Buildings and structures completed in 1814